NLRP14, short for NOD-like receptor family pyrin domain containing 14, is an intracellular protein of mammals associated with a role in spermatogenesis.  It is also known as NALP14, NOD5, GC-LRR, Nalp-iota, PAN8, and CLR11.2, and is one of 14 pyrin domain containing members of the NOD-like receptor family of cytoplasmic receptors.  NLRP14 is found exclusively in the testes where it is expressed within spermatogonia, spermatocytes and spermatids.

References

Further reading

External links 
 PDBe-KB provides an overview of all the structure information available in the PDB for Human NACHT, LRR and PYD domains-containing protein 14 (NLRP14)

LRR proteins
NOD-like receptors